Lena Stöcklin (born 22 May 1990) is a German slalom canoeist who has competed at the international level since 2011.

She won a bronze medal in the C1 team event at the 2013 ICF Canoe Slalom World Championships in Prague. She also won one silver and two bronze medals at the European Championships.

World Cup individual podiums

References

External links 

German female canoeists
Living people
1990 births
Medalists at the ICF Canoe Slalom World Championships